Franchetti is a surname. Notable people with the surname include: 

 Afdera Franchetti (born 1931), Italian noblewoman
 Alberto Franchetti (1860–1942), Italian opera composer
 Arnold Franchetti (1911–1993), Italian composer, son of Alberto 
 Leopoldo Franchetti (1847–1917), Italian publicist and politician
 Raimondo Franchetti (1889–1935), Italian nobleman and explorer
 Rina Franchetti (1907–2010), Italian actress
 Virgil Franchetti (born 1954), Scottish football player